Sylvio Couto Coelho da Frota (August 26, 1910 - October 23, 1996) was a Brazilian army general and minister of the Army during the Ernesto Geisel government.

Biography

Sylvio Frota studied at Colégio Pedro II. In 1928 he entered the Military School of Realengo.

He married Ídia Pragana da Frota. Frota had two children, one of them being Navy officer Luís Pragana da Frota. He is great-uncle of Alexandre Frota.

On December 20, 1977, Frota was awarded the Grand Cross of the Military Order of Avis of Portugal.

Frota was Roman Catholic.

Military career

In August 1934 he was promoted to first lieutenant. In June 1948 Frota was promoted to major. And in September 1952 the lieutenant colonel.

In 1955 Frota went against Marshal Lott's November 11 movement.

In April 1960 Frota was promoted to colonel.

In Jânio Quadros' resignation in 1960 he allied himself with the generals against the rise of João Goulart: Marshal Odílio Denis, Admiral Silvio Heck, and Brigadier Gabriel Grün Moss.

Frota participated and supported the 1964 coup. A few months later, in November, he was promoted to brigadier general.

Three years later, in 1967, he was the chief of staff of Army Minister Aurélio de Lira Tavares. Frota helped form the Army Information Center (CIE).

In March 1969 he was promoted to division general and commanded the 1st Military Region, in Rio de Janeiro, between February 27, 1969, and July 25, 1972.

In July 1972 Frota was promoted to army general. and assumed command of the 1st Army, replacing General João Bina Machado. He remained in that position between July 25, 1972, and April 5, 1974.

With Ernesto Geisel's inauguration on March 15, 1974, he was appointed chief of staff of the Army, where he remained for a short time, until May of that year.

Army minister

Sylvio Frota assumed the Ministry of the Army on May 27, 1974, after the death of the portfolio holder, General Vicente de Paulo Dale Coutinho.

As an extreme anti-communist, Frota represented the hardline of the Brazilian military regime.

The death of worker Manuel Fiel Filho in January 1976, shortly after the death of journalist Vladimir Herzog, caused much opposition and friction with President Geisel. The president removes Ednardo D'Ávila Melo, Silvio's ally, from the command of the II Army.

Candidacy for the presidency

In 1977, Sylvio Frota intended to run for president, against the wishes of Geisel, who declares that he would only consider the matter in January 1978. Geisel's preference was for General João Baptista de Oliveira Figueiredo.

In early August 1977, deputy Carlos Alberto de Oliveira threatened to launch the Frota candidacy.

On August 23, Geisel asked to approve a text that Frota had prepared to commemorate Soldier's Day; the unusual request generated friction.

On September 8, Frota threatened the journalist Lourenço Diaféria who praised the heroism of Silvio Hollembach against the figure of Duque de Caxias, patron of the army.

On October 4, General Jaime Portela, an ally of Costa e Silva and the regime's hard line, visited the capital to encourage support for "frotismo", support for the Frota candidacy.

Resignation on October 12, 1977

On October 10, Geisel announced to his closest allies, generals Golbery do Couto e Silva and Hugo Abreu, that he would fire Sylvio Frota within two days, when it would be a holiday in Brasilia. It would be the first exoneration of an army minister since 1964.

Golbery and Hugo Abreu instructed the Official Gazette to operate during the holiday.

The next day, on October 11, Geisel informed the commanders of the four armies of his decision.

On October 12, 1977, Geisel received Sylvio Frota. The resignation was published in the Official Gazette as well as the appointment of Fernando Belfort Bethlem, ex-commander of the III Army, as successor.

Sylvio Frota prepared an eight-page text to be distributed to all units of the army, which is not done.

After his dismissal, feeling ideologically upset, he withdraws from political life, despite demonstrations in favor of his candidacy, with the support of military leaders such as Marshal Odílio Denys, Admiral Augusto Rademaker and Brigadier Márcio de Sousa Melo.

Amnesty Act of August 29, 1979

In 1979, after the enactment of the Amnesty Law, Frota returned to the news as a sharp critic of the measure. He released a controversial list of alleged communists infiltrated as civil servants.

After that, he avoided further public pronouncements until he died in 1996.

Sources

AA.VV. - Dicionário Histórico-Biográfico Brasileiro. Rio de Janeiro: CPDOC, Fundação Getúlio Vargas
FROTA, Sylvio - Ideais traídos. Rio de Janeiro: Jorge Zahar Editor, 2006. 
GASPARI, Elio - A ditadura encurralada. São Paulo: Companhia da Letras, 2004

References

1910 births
1996 deaths
Brazilian Roman Catholics
Brazilian generals
Government of Brazil
Far-right politics in Brazil
People from Rio de Janeiro (city)